Moridunum may refer to:

Moridunum (Carmarthen), a Roman settlement at what is now Carmarthen in Wales
Moridunum (Axminster), a Roman settlement at what is now Axminster in England